LIRS may refer to:
 Grosseto Airport
 LIRS caching algorithm
 Lutheran Immigration and Refugee Service